Pyne & Marles was an Australian television political commentary which was broadcast weekly on Sky News Live. The program was co-hosted by two serving frontbench MPs, Liberal minister Christopher Pyne and Labor shadow minister Richard Marles, without a journalist or moderator. It covered the political issues of the week.

The series premiered on 6 February 2016 on Sky News Live at 8:30am AEDT, replacing Saturday Agenda and continuing weekly. The program was broadcast live. The hosts were given editorial control over the program, and neither was paid by Sky News for presenting the format.

The program moved to Friday afternoons for its second season, in the timeslot To The Point held on other weekdays at the time. The program ended in its fifth season after 105 episodes, shortly after Pyne announced his retirement from politics at the 2019 Australian federal election.

Episodes

Season 1

Season 2

Season 3

Season 4

Season 5

Reception
The program has been lampooned for the "awkward" presenting style of the presenters.

References

External links
Sky News Official site

Sky News Australia
Australian non-fiction television series
English-language television shows
2016 Australian television series debuts
Australian political television series
2019 Australian television series endings